Korambayil Ahamed Haji (16 July 1930 – 12 May 2003), born Korambayil Ahamed, later honorific Haji, was an Indian politician from Kerala. He served as the Deputy Speaker of Kerala Legislative Assembly from October 1986 to March 1987 (K. Karunakaran Ministry, 1982 - 87).

Ahamed Haji also served Kerala State General Secretary, Indian Union Muslim League.

Member of Legislative Assembly

Member of Parliament

References

Malayali politicians
Indian Union Muslim League politicians
Rajya Sabha members from Kerala
Kerala MLAs 1977–1979
Kerala MLAs 1980–1982
Kerala MLAs 1982–1987
Kerala MLAs 1987–1991
1930 births
2003 deaths